Piroozi is a neighbourhood in east Tehran, the capital city of Iran.

Neighbourhoods in Tehran